Mary Grey may refer to:
Mary Grey (theologian)
Lady Mary Grey, sister of Jane Grey, Queen of England
Mary Grey, Countess Grey, wife of Charles Grey, 2nd Earl Grey
Mary Grey, Countess of Kent (died 1702)
Mary Grey, Baroness Grey de Wilton
Mary Grey, character in 5th Ave Girl

See also
Mary Gray (disambiguation)
Mary Gray-Reeves, bishop